The Second Cain Ministry was the 53rd ministry of the Government of Victoria (Australia). It was led by the Premier of Victoria, John Cain of the Labor Party. The ministry was sworn in on 21 November 1945.

Portfolios

References

Victoria (Australia) ministries
Australian Labor Party ministries in Victoria (Australia)
Ministries of George VI